Rambo Rajkumar, born Rajkumar (21 October 1956 – 26 April 2009), was an Indian stunt director and action choreographer. He was the son of T.K.Paramasivam, who himself was in the stunt department. Rajkumar was a very highly respected stunt director and has worked in more than 500 films in all Indian languages and is known for his close association with actor Mithun Chakraborty. His posthumous release were the films Aayirathil Oruvan and Aadukalam.

Rajkumar earned the prefix 'Rambo' because of his style of realistic close combat scenes, which resembled Sylvester Stallone's style in the movie, Rambo. Top stunt masters like Kanal Kannan, Stun Siva, Peter Hein, Stunt Silva, Thalapathy Dinesh, Jaguar Thangam have worked as either stuntmen or stunt assistants to him.

On 26 April 2009, while filming for Kurradu a Telugu remake of the Tamil movie Polladhavan  in Hyderabad, Rajkumar suffered from a heart attack and died later that day.

Rajkumar has a son and two daughters. His eldest son Navakant Rambo Rajkumar  is an associate stunt director and short film maker. His second daughter R.K Navalakshmi is a radio jockey and his youngest daughter R.K.Navadevi is a costume designer in the film industry. Both the sisters have choreographed dance sequences in director Anurag Kashyap films Mukkabaaz and manmarziyaan

A film directed by actor/director Prabhu deva starring actor Shahid Kapoor released in 2013, R... Rajkumar was first named as Rambo Rajkumar but the name was later changed owing to copyright issues.

Filmography

 1987 Neram Nalla Irukku
 1987 Arul Tharum Ayyappan
 1988 Rayilukku Neramachu
 1989 Koyil Mani Osai
 1988 Enga Ooru Kavalkaran
 1989 Enne Petha Raasa
 1989 Manasukketha Maharasa
 1989 Raaja Raajathan
 1989 Anbu Kattalai
 1989 Paandi Nattu Thangam
 1990 Paattali Magan 
 1990 Jagathalaprathapan
 1990 Thangathin Thangam
 1990 Pachai Kodi
 1990 Periya Veetu Pannakkaran
 1990 Chilambu
 1990 Maruthu Pandi
 1990 Periya Idathu Pillai 
 1990 Vellaiya Thevan 
 1990 Naanum Indha Ooruthan
 1990 Puriyaadha Pudhir
 1990 Palaivana Paravaigal
 1990 Periya Idathu Pillai
 1990 Vellaya Thevan 
 1990 Puthu Paatu 
 1990 Namma Ooru Poovatha
 1991 Ethir Kaatru
 1991 Kumbakarai Thangaiah
 1991 Naadu Adhai Naadu 
 1991 Thambi Oorukku Pudhu
 1991 Namma Ooru Mariamma
 1991 Annan Kaattiya Vazhi 
 1991 Thanga Thamaraigal
 1991 En Rasavin Manasile 
 1991 Enga Oor Sippayi
 1991 Kaaval Nilayam
 1991 Nattai Thirudathe
 1991 Vaidhehi Kalyanam
 1991 Oorellam Un Pattu 
 1991 Naan Valartha Poove
 1991 Iravu Suriyan  
 1991 Nenjamundu Nermaiundu
 1991 Thaalattu Ketkuthamma
 1991 Thangamana Thangachi
 1992 Moratodu Naa Mogudu 
 1992 Prema Sikharam 
 1992 Brahmachari 
 1992 Pandithurai
 1992 Chinna Thayee
 1992 Agni Paravai
 1992 Government Mappillai 
 1992 Chinnavar
 1992 Nadodi Thendral
 1992 Mondi Mogudu Penki Pellam
 1992 Nadodi Pattukkaran
 1992 Unakkaga Piranthen
 1992 Ponnuketha Purushan
 1992 Thaali Kattiya Raasa
 1992 Pudhu Varusham
 1992 Kottai Vaasal 
 1992 Samundi
 1992 Chinna Poovai Killadhe
 1992 David Uncle
 1992 Solaiyamma
 1993 Shaktiman
 1993 Tahqiqaat
 1993 Khal-Naaikaa 
 1993 kundan
 1993 Chinna Mapillai
 1993 Maamiyar Veedu
 1993 Madurai Meenakshi
 1993 Uthama Raasa
 1993 Thangakkili
 1993 Sakkarai Devan
 1993 Doragaariki Donga Pellaam 
 1993 Karpagam Vandhachu  
 1994 Amaidhi Padai 
 1994 Siragadikka Aasai
 1994 Chinna Muthu
 1994 Cheetah
 1994 Janta Ki Adalat
 1994 En Rajangam
 1994 Rasa Magan
 1994 Vandicholai Chinraasu 
 1994 Seevalaperi Pandi
 1994 Kanmani 
 1994 Thozhar Pandian
 1994 Ilaignar Ani
 1994 Veera Padhakkam
 1994 Anokha Premyudh
 1995 Khaidi Inspector
 1995 Ahankaar
 1995 Zakhmi Sipahi
 1995 Jallad
 1995 Maidan-E-Jung
 1995 Gangai Karai Paattu
 1995 Engirundho Vandhan
 1995 Udhavum Karangal
 1995 En Pondatti Nallava
 1995 Villadhi Villain
 1995 Thamizhachi 
 1995 Ilavarasi
 1995 Varraar Sandiyar
 1996 Naattuppura Paattu 
 1996 Musthafa
 1996 Angaara (Hindi)
 1996 Muqaddar (Hindi)
 1996 Jurmana (Hindi)
 1996 Daanveer (Hindi)
 1997 Inferno (English)
 1997 Ettupatti Rasa
 1997 Paasamulla Pandiyare 
 1997 Samrat
 1997 Jodidar (Hindi)
 1997 Kaalia (Hindi)
 1997 Suraj (Hindi)
 1997 Shapath (Hindi)
 1997 My India
 1997 Jeevan Yudh (Hindi)
 1997 Gundagardi (Hindi)
 1997 Thambi Durai
 1998 Veera Thalattu
 1998 Sher-E-Hindustan (Hindi)
 1998 Chandaal (Hindi)
 1998 Hatyara
 1998 Ustadon Ka Ustad
 1998 Hitler
 1998 Do Numbri
 1998 Yamraaj
 1998 Zulm-O-Sitam
 1998 Chandaal
 1998 Gunda
 1998 Mard
 1998 Saazish
 1998 Mafia Raaj
 1998 Bhagavath Singh
 1999 Ganga Ki Kasam 
 1999 Aaag Hi Aag
 1999 Shera
 1999 Phool Aur Aag
 1999 Lal Baadshah
 1999 Maa Kasam
 1999 Kummi Paattu 
 2000 AgniPutra
 2000 Sultaan
 2000 Karisakattu Poove
 2000 Puratchikkaaran
 2000 Doubles
 2000 Kannaal Peasava 
 2000 Manuneedhi
 2001 Ninaikkatha Naalillai 
 2001 Baghaawat Ek Jung  
 2001 Jeetenge Hum
 2002 Mawali No.1
 2002 Thulluvadho Ilamai
 2003 Kadhal Kondein
 2003 Kovilpatti Veeralakshmi
 2003 Kadhal Kirukkan
 2004 Barood
 2004 Sound Party
 2004 Dreams 
 2005 Adhu Oru Kana Kaalam
 2005 Devdoot
 2005 Chita
 2006 Pudhupettai 
 2007 Cheena Thaana 001 
 2007 Polladhavan 
 2007 Mirugam 
 2008 Theekuchi 
 2008 Indira Vizha
 2009 Kurradu
 2010 Aayirathil Oruvan 
 2011 Aadukalam

Actor
 1988 Enga Ooru Kavalkaran
 1989 Enne Petha Raasa
 1989 Paandi Nattu Thangam
 1990 Chilambu
 1990 Thangathin Thangam
 1990 Periya Veetu Pannakkaran
 1990 Naanum Indha Ooruthan
 1991 En Rasavin Manasile 
 1992 Ponnuketha Purushan
 1992 Moratodu Naa Mogudu 
 1994 Amaidhi Padai 
 1998 Chandaal
 2000 Manu Needhi
 2003 Kadhal Kondein
 2003 Kovilpatti Veeralakshmi
 2011 Aaranya Kaandam

References

External links
 

Indian male film actors
Tamil male actors
Indian action choreographers
1956 births
2009 deaths
20th-century Indian male actors
Male actors from Tamil Nadu